Fajara is a coastal suburb of Bakau in the Gambia.

It is home to Isatou Njie-Saidy, a former Vice-President of the Gambia, the former US Ambassador, and formerly the home town of the late Sir Dawda Kairaba Jawara, a former Prime Minister of the Gambia and the first President of the Gambia. The Medical Research Council is located within a fenced complex on Atlantic Boulevard. There is also a large military camp.

Tourism

Prior to the arrival of the first tourists in the 1960s the inhabitants' living revolved largely around fishing. Fajara is, however, becoming an increasingly popular tourist destination with around 20 hotel complexes on the beach and many more inland.

Bertil Harding Highway is one of the town's main thoroughfares, named after the pioneering Swedish tourist who arrived in 1965.

Notable people
Alieu Fadera
Sir Dawda Jawara
Julia Dolly Joiner
Isatou Njie-Saidy
Mohamadou Sumareh
[[Malleh Sallah]**<
Dr Saja Taal
ref>https://standard.gm/leisure-group-denies-taking-over-ocean-bay/</ref>

Gallery

References

Populated places in the Gambia
Banjul